Hermann Aumer (30 April 1915 – 30 May 1955) was a German politician of the Bavaria Party (BP) and former member of the German Bundestag.

Life 
From 1949 to 1953, Aumer was a member of the German Bundestag for the Ingolstadt constituency for one term.

Literature

References

1915 births
1955 deaths
Bavaria Party politicians
Members of the Bundestag for Bavaria
Members of the Bundestag 1949–1953
Members of the Bundestag for the Bavaria Party